First Terrace Records is an independent record label founded in 2016 by Alex Ives & Joseph Summers.

First Terrace release music covering ambient, electronica, experimental, drone, jazz, modern composition & sound art. First Terrace have released music from artists such as Specimens, K. Leimer and the very well received Peter Broderick project The Beacon Sound Choir - 'Sunday Songs''' also featuring Machinefabriek.

Label philosophy
The name of the label and logo are inspired by Dante's Divine Comedy'' & the first level in Purgatorio. Depicting the souls of the proud bent over by the weight of huge stones on their backs in the face of sculptures expressing humility, the opposite virtue to pride which serves as an ethos for the label to remain humble.

The original First Terrace logo was sketched by co-founder Alex Ives and is present on only one record, Specimens - 'Sculptures' LP. Following this a refined version was used on all releases up until 2020 when the label introduced a new version of the logo which is present to this day. Consistent throughout all versions of the logo are the legs (of the proud) which symbolise holding up the weight of pride & thus a reminder to remain humble in your work.

Artists
List of artists First Terrace Records have released records for:

Anna Homler
Ben Vince & Jacob Samuel
Bianca Scout
Bora
Chihei Hatakeyama
Holland Andrews (Like A Villain)
Justin Wright
K. Leimer
Machinefabriek
NikNak
Peter Broderick (Beacon Sound Choir)
Pierre Bastien
Sofheso
Sunik Kim
Specimens
Vida Vojić

References

External links
 Official website

See also
List of record labels

Electronic music record labels
Ambient music record labels
Experimental music record labels
British independent record labels
Articles with MusicBrainz label links